Harry Aston may refer to:

Harry Aston (footballer, born 1855) (1855–1914), English footballer who scored the first recorded goal of West Bromwich Albion
Harry Aston (footballer, born 1881) (1881–1938), English footballer

See also
Harry Ashton (disambiguation)
Henry Aston (1759–1798),  English cricketer